Agathomyia wankowiczii is a species of flat-footed fly in the family Platypezidae.

References

Platypezidae
Insects described in 1884